Ring 1 may refer to:

Roads 
 Ring I, in Finland
 Ring 1 (Aarhus), in Denmark
 Ring 1 (Hamburg), in Germany

Other uses 
 RING1, a gene
 Ring 1, the first magic club of the International Brotherhood of Magicians
 Ring 1, a protection ring in computer security

See also

 Ring (disambiguation)
 One ring (disambiguation)
 The Ring (franchise)
 Ring (film), a 1998 Japanese horror film, first in a series
 The Ring (2002 film), an American horror film, first in a series